The GeForce 4 series (codenames below) refers to the fourth generation of GeForce-branded graphics processing units (GPUs) manufactured by Nvidia. There are two different GeForce4 families, the high-performance Ti family, and the budget MX family. The MX family spawned a mostly identical GeForce4 Go (NV17M) family for the laptop market. All three families were announced in early 2002; members within each family were differentiated by core and memory clock speeds. In late 2002, there was an attempt to form a fourth family, also for the laptop market, the only member of it being the GeForce4 4200 Go (NV28M) which was derived from the Ti line.

GeForce4 Ti

Architecture
The GeForce4 Ti (NV25) was launched in February 2002 and was a revision of the GeForce 3 (NV20). It was very similar to its predecessor; the main differences were higher core and memory clock rates, a revised memory controller (known as Lightspeed Memory Architecture II), updated pixel shaders with new instructions for Direct3D 8.0a support, an additional vertex shader (the vertex and pixel shaders were now known as nFinite FX Engine II), hardware anti-aliasing (Accuview AA), and DVD playback. Legacy Direct3D 7-class fixed-function T&L was now implemented as vertex shaders. Proper dual-monitor support (TwinView) was also brought over from the GeForce 2 MX. The GeForce 4 Ti was superior to the GeForce 4 MX in virtually every aspect save for production cost, although the MX had the Nvidia VPE (video processing engine) which the Ti lacked.

Lineup
The initial two models were the Ti4400 and the top-of-the-range Ti4600. At the time of their introduction, Nvidia's main products were the entry-level GeForce 2 MX, the midrange GeForce4 MX models (released the same time as the Ti4400 and Ti4600), and the older but still high-performance GeForce 3 (demoted to the upper mid-range or performance niche). However, ATI's Radeon 8500LE was somewhat cheaper than the Ti4400, and outperformed its price competitors, the GeForce 3 Ti200 and GeForce4 MX 460. The GeForce 3 Ti500 filled the performance gap between the Ti200 and the Ti4400 but it could not be produced cheap enough to compete with the Radeon 8500. 

In consequence, Nvidia rolled out a slightly cheaper model: the Ti4200. Although the 4200 was initially supposed to be part of the launch of the GeForce4 line, Nvidia had delayed its release to sell off the soon-to-be discontinued GeForce 3 chips. In an attempt to prevent the Ti4200 damaging the Ti4400's sales, Nvidia set the Ti4200's memory speed at 222 MHz on the models with a 128 MiB frame buffer—a full 53 MHz slower than the Ti4400 (all of which had 128 MiB frame buffers). Models with a 64 MiB frame buffer were set to 250 MHz memory speed. This tactic didn't work however, for two reasons. Firstly, the Ti4400 was perceived as being not good enough for those who wanted top performance (who preferred the Ti4600), nor those who wanted good value for money (who typically chose the Ti4200), causing the Ti4400 to be a pointless middle ground of the two. Furthermore, some graphics card makers simply ignored Nvidia's guidelines for the Ti4200, and set the memory speed at 250 MHz on the 128 MiB models anyway. 

Then in late 2002, the NV25 core was replaced by the NV28 core, which differed only by addition of AGP-8X support. The Ti4200 with AGP-8X support was based on this chip, and sold as the Ti4200-8X. A Ti4800SE replaced the Ti4400 and a Ti4800 replaced the Ti4600 respectively when the 8X AGP NV28 core was introduced on these.

The only mobile derivative of the Ti series was the GeForce4 4200 Go (NV28M), launched in late 2002. The solution featured the same feature-set and similar performance compared to the NV28-based Ti4200, although the mobile variant was clocked lower. It outperformed the Mobility Radeon 9000 by a large margin, as well as being Nvidia's first DirectX 8 laptop graphics solution. However, because the GPU was not designed for the mobile space, it had thermal output similar to the desktop part. The 4200 Go also lacked power-saving circuitry like the MX-based GeForce4 4x0 Go series or the Mobility Radeon 9000. This caused problems for notebook manufacturers, especially with regards to battery life.

Performance
The GeForce4 Ti outperformed the older GeForce 3 by a significant margin. The competing ATI Radeon 8500 was generally faster than the GeForce 3 line, but was overshadowed by the GeForce 4 Ti in every area other than price and more advanced pixel shader (1.4) support. Nvidia, however, missed a chance to dominate the upper-range/performance segment by delaying the release of the Ti4200 and by not rolling out 128 MiB models quickly enough; otherwise the Ti4200 was cheaper and faster than the previous top-line GeForce 3 and Radeon 8500.  Besides the late introduction of the Ti4200, the limited release 128 MiB models of the GeForce 3 Ti200 proved unimpressive, letting the Radeon 8500LE and even the full 8500 dominated the upper-range performance for a while. The Matrox Parhelia, despite having several DirectX 9.0 capabilities and other innovative features, was at most competitive with the GeForce 3 and GeForce 4 Ti 4200, but it was priced the same as the Ti 4600 at US$399.

The GeForce 4 Ti4200 enjoyed considerable longevity compared to its higher-clocked peers. At half the cost of the 4600, the 4200 remained the best balance between price and performance until the launch of the ATI Radeon 9500 Pro at the end of 2002. The Ti4200 still managed to hold its own against several next generation DirectX 9 chips released in late 2003, outperforming the GeForce FX 5200 and the midrange FX 5600, and performing similarly to the mid-range Radeon 9600 Pro in some situations.

GeForce4 MX

Architecture

Though its lineage was of the past-generation GeForce2, the GeForce4 MX did incorporate bandwidth and fill rate-saving techniques, dual-monitor support, and a multi-sampling anti-aliasing unit from the Ti series; the improved 128-bit DDR memory controller was crucial to solving the bandwidth limitations that plagued the GeForce 256 and GeForce2 lines. It also owed some of its design heritage to Nvidia's high-end CAD products, and in performance-critical non-game applications it was remarkably effective. The most notable example is AutoCAD, in which the GeForce4 MX returned results within a single-digit percentage of GeForce4 Ti cards several times the price.

Many criticized the GeForce4 MX name as a misleading marketing ploy since it was less advanced than the preceding GeForce3. In the features comparison chart between the Ti and MX lines, it showed that the only "feature" that was missing on the MX was the nfiniteFX II engine—the DirectX 8 programmable vertex and pixel shaders. However, the GeForce4 MX was not a GeForce4 Ti with the shader hardware removed, as the MX's performance in games that did not use shaders was considerably behind the GeForce4 Ti and GeForce3.

Despite harsh criticism by gaming enthusiasts, the GeForce4 MX was a market success. Priced about 30% above the GeForce2 MX, it provided better performance, the ability to play a number of popular games that the GeForce2 could not run well—above all else—to the average non-specialist it sounded as if it were a "real" GeForce4—i.e., a GeForce4 Ti. The GeForce4 MX was particularly successful in the PC OEM market, and rapidly replaced the GeForce2 MX as the best-selling GPU.

In motion-video applications, the GeForce4 MX offered new functionality.  It (and not the GeForce4 Ti) was the first GeForce member to feature the Nvidia VPE (video processing engine). It was also the first GeForce to offer hardware-iDCT and VLC (variable length code) decoding, making VPE a major upgrade from Nvidia's previous HDVP.  In the application of MPEG-2 playback, VPE could finally compete head-to-head with ATI's video engine.

Lineup

There were 3 initial models: the MX420, the MX440 and the MX460. The MX420 had only Single Data Rate (SDR) memory and was designed for very low end PCs, replacing the GeForce2 MX100 and MX200. The GeForce4 MX440 was a mass-market OEM solution, replacing the GeForce2 MX/MX400 and GeForce2 Ti. The GeForce4 MX460 was initially meant to slot in between the MX440 and the Ti4400, but the late addition of the Ti4200 to the line at a very similar price point (combined with the existing GeForce3 Ti200 and ATI's Radeon 8500LE/9100, which were also similarly priced) prevented the MX460 from ever being truly competitive, and the model soon faded away.

In terms of 3D performance, the MX420 performed only slightly better than the GeForce2 MX400 and below the GeForce2 GTS. However, this was never really much of a problem, considering its target audience. The nearest thing to a direct competitor the MX420 had was ATI's Radeon 7000. In practice its main competitors were chipset-integrated graphics solutions, such as Intel's 845G and Nvidia's own nForce 2, but its main advantage over those was multiple-monitor support; Intel's solutions did not have this at all, and the nForce 2's multi-monitor support was much inferior to what the MX series offered.

The MX440 performed reasonably well for its intended audience, outperforming its closest competitor, the ATI Radeon 7500, as well as the discontinued GeForce2 Ti and Ultra. When ATI launched its Radeon 9000 Pro in September 2002, it performed about the same as the MX440, but had crucial advantages with better single-texturing performance and proper support of DirectX 8 shaders. However, the 9000 was unable to break the MX440's entrenched hold on the OEM market. Nvidia's eventual answer to the Radeon 9000 was the GeForce FX 5200, but despite the 5200's DirectX 9 features it did not have a significant performance increase compared to the MX440 even in DirectX 7.0 games. This kept the MX440 in production while the 5200 was discontinued. 

The GeForce4 Go was derived from the MX line and it was announced along with the rest of the GeForce4 lineup in early 2002. There was the 420 Go, 440 Go, and 460 Go. However, ATI had beaten them to the market with the similarly performing Mobility Radeon 7500, and later the DirectX 8.0 compliant Mobility Radeon 9000. (Despite its name, the short-lived 4200 Go is not part of this lineup, it was instead derived from the Ti line.)

Like the Ti series, the MX was also updated in late 2002 to support AGP-8X with the NV18 core. The two new models were the MX440-8X, which was clocked slightly faster than the original MX440, and the MX440SE, which had a narrower memory bus, and was intended as a replacement of sorts for the MX420. The MX460, which had been discontinued by this point, was never replaced. Another variant followed in late 2003—the MX 4000, which was a GeForce4 MX440SE with a slightly higher memory clock.

The GeForce4 MX line received a third and final update in 2004, with the PCX 4300, which was functionally equivalent to the MX 4000 but with support for PCI Express. In spite of its new codename (NV19), the PCX 4300 was in fact simply an NV18 core with a BR02 chip bridging the NV18's native AGP interface with the PCI-Express bus.

GeForce4 model information

GeForce4 Go driver support 
This family is a derivative of the GeForce4 MX family, produced for the laptop market. The GeForce4 Go family, performance wise, can be considered comparable to the MX line.

One possible solution to the lack of driver support for the Go family is the third party Omega Drivers. Using third party drivers can, among other things, invalidate warranties. The Omega Drivers are supported by neither laptop manufacturers, laptop ODMs, nor by Nvidia. Nvidia attempted legal action against a version of Omega Drivers that included the Nvidia logo.

Discontinued support 

Nvidia has ceased driver support for GeForce 4 series.

Final drivers
 Windows 9x & Windows Me: 81.98 released on December 21, 2005; Download;
Product Support List Windows 95/98/Me – 81.98.
 Windows 2000, 32-bit Windows XP, 64-bit Windows XP & Media Center Edition: 93.71 released on November 2, 2006; Download.
 Windows 2000, 32-bit Windows XP, 64-bit Windows XP & Media Center Edition: 93.81 (beta) released on November 28, 2006; Download.
(Products supported list also on this page)
Windows 95/98/Me Driver Archive
Windows XP/2000 Driver Archive
 Linux/BSD/Solaris: 96.43.xx
Unix Driver Archive

See also 
Graphics card
Graphics processing unit
Kelvin (microarchitecture)

Notes and references

External links 

 Nvidia: GeForce4 family of GPUs
 ForceWare 81.98 drivers, Final Windows 9x/ME driver release
 ForceWare 93.71 drivers, Final Windows XP driver release
 techPowerUp! GPU Database

4 Series
Graphics cards
Computer-related introductions in 2002